Chad Cota (born August 13, 1971) is a former professional American football strong safety in the NFL.  He attended Ashland High School followed by the University of Oregon.  He was drafted by the Carolina Panthers in the 1995 NFL Draft and went on to play for the New Orleans Saints, Indianapolis Colts, and the St. Louis Rams over eight seasons, retiring in 2003. He is the uncle of Detroit Lions safety Brady Breeze and the father of University of Oregon wide receiver Chase Cota.

Cota was named to the Carolina Panthers 10 Year Anniversary Team as a safety.  His interception in the end zone versus Pittsburgh on the Steelers final possession to preserve victory and clinch the NFC West division title is named as the #10 most memorable play in Carolina Panthers history. He and Pat Terrell both had 49-yard interception returns against Dallas in the first round of the 1996 playoffs, thereby tying each other for the career, season, and single-game Panthers' franchise records for post-season interception return yards.

References

 scout.com referenced 19 January 2006

External links
 Chad Cota Golf Shootout Charity Golf Tournament

American football safeties
1971 births
Living people
Sportspeople from Ashland, Oregon
Oregon Ducks football players
Carolina Panthers players
New Orleans Saints players
Indianapolis Colts players
St. Louis Rams players
Players of American football from Oregon
Ashland High School (Oregon) alumni